The State Security Service (Uzbek Davlat Xavfsizlik Xizmati, DXX; in Russian Служба государственной безопасности, СГБ, often romanised as SGB) is the national intelligence agency of the government of Uzbekistan. It was created on 26 September 1991 as a successor to the KGB and its republican affiliate in the Uzbek SSR. Since the collapse of the Soviet Union, it has retained the same responsibilities and a similar range of functional units, including paramilitary police and special forces. It was renamed from the National Security Service on 14 March 2018. The SNB was a rival of the Interior Ministry until 2005, when it was brought under its control. In recent years, the SNB has been sidelined in favor of the Uzbekistan National Guard, which was largely seen as being loyal to former president Islam Karimov.

The SNB is described by Amnesty International and the Institute for War and Peace Reporting as a secret police force.

Leadership
The following officials have led the SNB since its establishment:

Rustam Inoyatov (27 June 1995–31 January 2018)
Ikhtiyor Abdullayev (31 January 2018–11 February 2019)
Abdusalom Azizov (Since 11 February 2019)

Rustam Inoyatov was the head of the SNB for over 20 years beginning in 1995. The deputy director of the SNB was in 2005 appointed Minister of the Interior. A reorganisation of the security and counter-terrorism agencies in the aftermath of the Andijan massacre significantly increased the power and resources of the SNB. In February 2019, the SNB head Ikhtiyor Abdullayev was fired after he was accused to have conducted surveillance on President Shavkat Mirziyoyev's personal phone. 

Some analysts maintain that the SNB is under the control of the Tashkent clan, a powerful faction within the Uzbek elite.

The following people served as chairmen of the Uzbek KGB:

 Alexei Byzov (20 April 1954 – 11 February 1960)
 Georgy Naymushin (26 February 1960 – 14 December 1963)
 Sergey Kiselev (14 December 1963 – 25 October 1969)
 Alexey Beschastnovr (25 October 1969 – 25 October 1974)
 Eduard Nordman (25 October 1974 – 2 March 1978)
 Levon Melkumov (2 March 1978 – 24 August 1983)
 Vladimir Golovin (24 August 1983 – 27 January 1989) 
 Anatoly Morgasov (23 February 1989 – 12 June 1991)
 Gulam Aliyev (12 June 1991 – 26 September 1991)

Activities and human rights abuses
The SNB has been closely associated with the authoritarian administration of President Islam Karimov, and has been accused of involvement in human rights abuses and in sponsoring acts of terrorism to provide a pretext for repressive policing. Radio Free Europe/Radio Liberty has reported claims that the 1999 Tashkent bombings were carried out by the SNB, then led by Rustam Inoyatov of the Tashkent clan, and that the SNB may also have been responsible for a series of bombings in 2004 in Tashkent and Bukhara.

Fear of the SNB is so widespread in Uzbekistan that it is considered dangerous to say its name in public. However, this situation is gradually changing at least on the surface.

Torture
The U.S. Department of State's 2004 Country Report on Human Rights Practices in Uzbekistan stated that SNB officials "tortured, beat, and harassed" citizens.

Andijan massacre
On 13 May 2005 SNB troops, along with military and Interior Ministry forces, killed a large number of protesters in Andijan, in an event that became known as the Andijan massacre. Estimates of those killed range widely, from the official figure of 187 to upwards of 1,000. The protests related to the arrest of a group of local businessmen, and the massacre was preceded by disorder including, according to Pravda, an attempt to seize the regional headquarters of the SNB.

Internet censorship

The OpenNet Initiative reports that the SNB is extensively involved in Internet censorship. The OpenNet Initiative reports that the SNB:

"monitors the Uzbek sector of the Internet and 'stimulates' ISPs and Internet cafés to practice self-censorship. Soviet-style censorship structures were replaced by 'monitoring sections' that work under SNB’s guidance. There is no mandatory government prepublication review, but ISPs risk having their licenses revoked if they post 'inappropriate' information. Occasionally, the SNB orders ISPs to block access to opposition or religious Web sites. A survey of internet filtering practices among Uzbek ISPs was conducted by ONI in January 2007. Respondents confirmed that they use filtering applications including SquidGuard and FortiGuard. The SNB's censorship is selective and often targets articles on government corruption, violations of human rights, and organized crime. Usually, it affects URL-specific pages instead of top-level domain names. Uzbek ISPs block entire Web sites or individual pages upon SNB's unofficial requests. Accessing a blocked page redirects the user to a search engine or to an error message such as 'You are not authorized to view this page.' The retransmission of blocked channels is also prohibited.

Organization
The SNB is known to have special purpose units "Alpha", "Cobra", "Ts" and "Scorpion" under its direct command. The Border Service and Customs Service of Uzbekistan answer to the SNB since being placed under its control in 2005. With corruption in the Country being the highest, the organization fully separated itself from the Nation but stays under mafia control. Its duties were recently laid out in a decree by President Mirziyoyev in January 2018.

References

Politics of Uzbekistan
Political organisations based in Uzbekistan
Non-military counterterrorist organizations
Domestic intelligence agencies
Secret police
National security institutions
Law enforcement in Uzbekistan